The Portuguese Indoor Men's Athletics Championship (Campeonato Nacional Masculino de Atletismo em Pista Coberta) is the top division of men's teams in athletics in Portugal. It is a competition organized by the Federação Portuguesa de Atletismo. It started with few disciplines, 60 metres, 400 metres, 1500 metres, 4 × 400 metres relay and 60 metres hurdles, plus other like High Jump, Long Jump and Shot put. A year later it had all of the indoor disciplines practiced. The league consists of 8 teams that are selected after a playoff. The current champions are  Benfica, who have won 11 titles in total.

Portuguese Indoor Men's Champions

1994 - Benfica
1995 - Benfica
1996 - Sporting
1997 - Sporting
1998 - Sporting
1999 - Sporting
2000 - Sporting
2001 - Sporting
2002 - Sporting
2003 - Sporting
2004 - Sporting
2005 - Sporting
2006 - Sporting

2007 - Sporting
2008 - Sporting
2009 - Sporting
2010 - Sporting
2011 - Sporting
2012 - Benfica
2013 - Benfica
2014 - Benfica
2015 - Benfica
2016 - Benfica
2017 - Sporting
2018 - Benfica
2019 - Benfica

2020 - Benfica
2021 - Sporting
2022 - Benfica

Performance by club

Championships records

References

External links
 Portuguese Athletics Federation Official website

Athletics competitions in Portugal
Recurring sporting events established in 1994
Portuguese Athletics Championship
National indoor athletics competitions
1994 establishments in Portugal
Men's athletics competitions